Association Sportive de l'Excelsior is an association football club from Saint-Joseph, Réunion Island.

Stadium
The club plays its home matches at Stade Raphaël Babet, which has a maximum capacity of 2,130.

Achievements
 Réunion Premier League: 1
1974

 Coupe de la Réunion: 4
2004, 2005, 2014,2015

Performance in CAF competitions
 CAF Champions League: 1 appearance
2006 – Preliminary Round

The club in the French football structure
 French Cup: 7 appearances
1974–75, 2001–02, 2009–10, 2014–15, 2015–16, 2016–17, 2017–2018
{| class="wikitable" style="text-align: center"
|+ Ties won
! Year !! Round !! Home team (tier) !! Score !! Away team (tier)
|-
| 2009–10 || Round 7 || AS Excelsior || 1–0 || Quimper (4)
|-
| 2015–16 || Round 7 || AS Excelsior || 1–0  || AS Poissy (4)
|-
| 2016–17 || Round 7 || Avoine OCC (5) || 1–1   || AS Excelsior
|-
| 2016–17 || Round 8 || AS Excelsior || 1–1   || FC Mulhouse (4)
|-
| 2017–18 || Round 7 || Feignies Aulnoye FC (5) || 1–3 || AS Excelsior
|}

Current squad

 
Excelsior
Association football clubs established in 1940
1940 establishments in Réunion